Kelly Lake may refer to: 
Kelly Lake - a lake in Lakeland, Florida
Kelly Lake, a lake in Carver County, Minnesota
Kelly Lake, a lake in Rice County, Minnesota
Kelly Lake (Annapolis), a lake in Annapolis County, Nova Scotia
Kelly Lake (Eastern Shore), a lake in Halifax Regional Municipality, Nova Scotia
Kelly Lake (Enfield), a lake in Halifax Regional Municipality, Nova Scotia
Kelly Lake (Guysborough), a lake in Guysborough District, Nova Scotia
Kelly Lake, a lake in Oconto County, Wisconsin
Kelly Lake, any one of four lakes in British Columbia, Canada, including:
Kelly Lake, British Columbia, located just east of the lake in the Peace River Country of the province's northeast
Kelly Lake, the centrepiece of Downing Provincial Park in the province's South Cariboo region, just east of the town of Clinton
Kelly Lake, a lake near Watsonville in Santa Cruz County, California
Kelly Lake, a lake in Henry Coe State Park in Santa Clara County, California